Spagnola is an Italian surname, meaning literally "Spanish", from and/or of "Spain" and may refer to:

Music and film 
 "La spagnola", an art song by Vincenzo di Chiara (1860–1937)
 La Spagnola (film), an Australian film

People 
 John Spagnola (born 1957), a former professional American football tight end
 Mickey Spagnola (21st century), an American sportswriter

See also
 Spagnoli
 Spagnolo

Italian-language surnames
Italian people of Spanish descent
Toponymic surnames
Ethnonymic surnames